David Griff (born 6 March 1956) is an Australian alpine skier. He competed in two events at the 1976 Winter Olympics.

References

1956 births
Living people
Australian male alpine skiers
Olympic alpine skiers of Australia
Alpine skiers at the 1976 Winter Olympics